Baron Rootes, of Ramsbury in the County of Wiltshire, is a title in the Peerage of the United Kingdom. It was created on 16 February 1959 for the businessman Sir William Rootes. He was head of the motor car manufacturer Rootes Ltd.  the title is held by his grandson, the third Baron, who succeeded his father in 1992.

Barons Rootes (1959)
William Edward Rootes, 1st Baron Rootes (1894–1964)
(William) Geoffrey Rootes, 2nd Baron Rootes (1917–1992)
Nicholas Geoffrey Rootes, 3rd Baron Rootes (b. 1951)

The heir presumptive and sole heir to the barony is the present holder's first cousin William Brian Rootes (b. 1944).

References

Kidd, Charles, Williamson, David (editors). Debrett's Peerage and Baronetage (1990 edition). New York: St Martin's Press, 1990, 

Baronies in the Peerage of the United Kingdom
Noble titles created in 1959